Vickerson is a surname. Notable people with the surname include:

Kevin Vickerson (born 1983), American football player
Laura Vickerson (born 1959), Canadian artist